The 1935 South American Basketball Championship was the 4th edition of this regional tournament. It was held in Rio de Janeiro, Brazil and won by the host, Argentina national basketball team.  3 teams competed.

Final rankings

Results

Each team played the other two teams twice apiece, for a total of four games played by each team.

External links

FIBA.com archive for SAC1935

1935
S
B
1935 in Brazilian sport
Champ
20th century in Rio de Janeiro
International sports competitions in Rio de Janeiro (city)
June 1935 sports events